MECC is the Minnesota Educational Computing Consortium.

MECC may also refer to:

MATRADE Exhibition and Convention Centre, in Kuala Lumpur, Malaysia
McKinley Exchange Corporate Center, an office building and bus terminal in Makati, Philippines
MECC Maastricht, Maastricht Exhibition & Conference Centre
Microbial electrolysis carbon capture
Middle East Cancer Consortium, an international initiative on cancer treatment and research
Middle East Council of Churches
Minimized extracorporeal circulation
Missouri Eastern Correctional Center, a male prison in central-eastern Missouri
Mountain Empire Community College, a community college located in Big Stone Gap, Virginia